John Marvin Brandon (May 8, 1888 – September 16, 1960) was a politician from Alabama. He served as State Auditor of Alabama from 1931 to 1935, 1943 to 1947 and 1951 to 1955. He also served as Alabama State Treasurer from 1947 to 1951 and 1955 to 1959 and served as Secretary of State of Alabama from 1927 to 1931 and 1939 to 1943.

Brandon began his business career in the State Auditor's office in Montgomery, July 1908 and in January 1923, he was appointed Secretary of the Alabama Public Service Commission.

He married in June 1915 and had one child. He died on September 16, 1960.

References

1888 births
1960 deaths
alabama Democrats